Maitra is also a synonym for Mettā, a Buddhist philosophy

Maitra, alternatively spelled Moitra or Maitreya, is a Bengali Hindu family name found among the Bengali Brahmins of the Varendra clan. It is one of the oldest surnames of Bengal, coming from the Varendra Brahmin clans.

A few notable people 
 Dwijendranath Maitra (1878-1950), Indian doctor and social worker
 Sisir Kumar Maitra (1887-1963), Indian philosopher
 Radhika Mohan Maitra (1917-1981), Indian sarod player
 Shantanu Moitra (born 1968), Indian music director
 Krishnananda Agamavagisha , was a Moitra  at birth, before acquiring his titles, (probably 1650-????), a Tantra sadhak and guru of Sadhak Ramprashad Sen and author of "Brihat Tantrasara" and advent Dakshina Kali idol.
 Mahua Moitra, Indian politician and member of parliament
 Saptak Maitra [2003- ]

References 

Bengali Hindu surnames